Aleese Simmons (born January 24, 1964) is an American singer-songwriter best known for her 1988 hit single "I Want To Be Your Lover", which peaked at #9 on the Billboard R&B chart. Signed to Orpheus Records, Simmons subsequently released the 1988 album I Want It, her only album to date, before moving into songwriting, working with artists such as Aretha Franklin, Whitney Houston, Destiny's Child, and Christina Milian. Simmons is the mother and manager of fellow R&B singer Latrelle.

Discography
Studio albums
 I Want It (1988) Orpheus Records – #51 Billboard R&B Albums Chart
Singles
 "I Want To Be Your Lover" (1988) – #9 Billboard R&B Chart
 "I Want It" (1989) – #53 Billboard R&B Chart 
 "Love You Better" (1989)

Songwriting and production credits
Credits are courtesy of Discogs, Tidal, and AllMusic.

Background vocals

References 

1964 births
Living people
African-American songwriters
American rhythm and blues singer-songwriters